Valentin (Val/Valio) Kovachev (born May 6, 1964 in Sofia, Bulgaria) is a Bulgarian professional bridge player who lives in Las Vegas.

Career
Kovachev has been playing professional bridge since 2003. Kovachev has won all the major Bulgarian bridge championships. Additionally, he has won the Schapiro Cup in England, and placed second on two other occasions. Valentin Kovachev has three top 3 finishes in the NEC Cup in 2010, 2011, and 2012.

Bridge accomplishments

Wins
 North American Bridge Championships (1)
 Wernher Open Pairs (1) 2013

Runners-up
 NEC Japan

Notes

References

1964 births
Bulgarian contract bridge players
Living people
Sportspeople from Sofia